Andrew Whipp (Born 7th April 1969) is a British actor. Whipp has received critical acclaim for many of his stage performances; most recently playing Gordon in F*ck the Polar Bears at the Bush Theatre. He was named in the Best Performances of 2010 list in the Sunday Times Irish Edition for his performance as Bernard Nightingale in Arcadia (play) by Tom Stoppard at the Gate Theatre, Dublin, directed by Patrick Mason. His performance was described by The Irish Times critic Peter Crawley "Whipp does a marvellous job of being likeably contemptible".

Television

Film

Stage

References

External links

Living people
1969 births